Wolfgang Sofsky (born 1952) is a German sociologist and former professor of sociology at University of Göttingen and Erfurt University.

Works

References

German sociologists
Academic staff of the University of Göttingen
Academic staff of the University of Erfurt
1952 births
Living people